Catterall is a village and civil parish in the borough of Wyre, Lancashire, England. Historically in the Amounderness Hundred, it is situated on the A6 between Lancaster and Preston, a short distance from the town of Garstang, and Myerscough College. The rivers Wyre, Calder and Brock run through the parish and in places form the parish boundary.

Etymology 

Catterall is mentioned in the Domesday Book as Catrehala Later references include Catrehal, 1272; Katerhalle, 1277; Caterhale, Caterale, 1292.

The etymology of the name suggests that the 'hala'or 'halh' part may refer to a topographical feature, indicating that the land mass forming the parish was, in times of antiquity, a 'promontory into the marsh'. This has a certain appeal, as the western edge of the parish does indeed border the flatlands of The Fylde. The same source also suggests that the first section of the name may be associated with a cat. However, this is an educated guess, as no other evidence has been uncovered to support the theory, other than the observation that the old parish boundary had the appearance of a (cats?) tongue.

History 

On 14 February 1716, three local men (Joseph Wadsworth and Thomas Goose of Catterall and Thomas Cartmell of Claughton) were executed for joining the Jacobite rebellion of 1715. They were reputedly executed at Stocks Lane End. In modern times, this is where Cock Robin Lane and Catterall Lane join the A6.

The parish is traversed by several important routes, including the A6, the M6 Motorway, the West Coast Main Line, the B6430 and the Lancaster Canal, all of which run, more-or-less north to south. The parish was served by Garstang and Catterall railway station, which used to stand on the West Coast Main Line, but was closed in the 1960s and later demolished.

In May 2007, Gennaro Panzuto, a member of the Camorra, was arrested in Catterall in connection with gang-related murders.

Geography 

The 2011 census showed that 2,280 people lived in the parish of Catterall, of whom 1,124 were male and 1,126 were female.

The main employer in Catterall is Franklaw Water Treatment Works on Catterall Lane. The site has developed since the 1960s from a couple of 'Dalek' style boreholes, to a large water treatment works, operated by United Utilities.

The other main employer is Collinson Plc, who manufacture agricultural and industrial buildings.

There is a Post Office within the Village Hall open Tuesday’s and Thursday’s 11:15 - 14:15. Where all main Post Office services are offered. 

The adjoining parishes are Claughton, Kirkland, Barnacre-with-Bonds, Upper Rawcliffe-with-Tarnacre and Myerscough and Bilsborrow.

Governance
An electoral ward in the same name exists. This ward stretches slightly beyond the confines of the parish and has a total population at the 2011 Census of 2,594.

See also

Listed buildings in Catterall

References

Bibliography
 Gelling, M., (2000), Place-Names in the Landscape,Phoenix Press,

External links
 Catterall Cop in Parking Row
 The Catterall Cosa Nostra connection
 'Catterall' A History of the County of Lancaster: Volume 7 (1912), pp. 320–24.
 A Topographical description of England - Catteral
 Catterall Parish Council minutes and other interesting stuff
 'Maps' Ordnance Survey Maps of Catterall from 1847 to 1933
  'Collinson Plc' Collinson Plc, manufacturer of agricultural and industrial buildings
 'Family website' The Catterall Family Web-Site
 'Lee Catterall' Another Catterall Family website
 'Arnold Catterall' Catterall Family website

Villages in Lancashire
Civil parishes in Lancashire
Geography of the Borough of Wyre